James Henry Weaver (10 June 1883 in Madison County, Ohio – 7 April 1942 in Franklin County, Ohio) was an American mathematician.

Weaver received B.A. in 1908 from Otterbein College and M.A. in 1911 from Ohio State University. He was a teaching assistant at Ohio State University from 1910 to 1912. He entered the mathematics doctoral program at the University of Pennsylvania in 1912 and graduated there in 1916 with advisor Maurice Babb and thesis Some Extensions of the Work of Pappus and Steiner on Tangent Circles.

From 1912 to 1917 he was head of the mathematics department of West Chester High School in West Chester, Pennsylvania. He became an instructor in 1917 and in 1920 an assistant professor at Ohio State University.

He was an Invited Speaker of the ICM in 1924.

Selected publications
 (See Pappus of Alexandria.)
 (See angle trisection.)
 (See Platonic solid.)
 (See doubling the cube.)

    

 (See Steiner chain.)
 (See strophoid.)

with R. D. Carmichael: 
with R. D. Carmichael and Lincoln LaPaz: 

 (See Tschirnhausen cubic.)

References

20th-century American mathematicians
Otterbein University alumni
Ohio State University alumni
University of Pennsylvania alumni
Ohio State University faculty
1883 births
1942 deaths